The Guldbagge for Best Cinematography is a Swedish film award presented annually by the Swedish Film Institute (SFI) as part of the Guldbagge Awards (Swedish: "Guldbaggen") to cinematographers working in the Swedish motion picture industry.

Winners and nominees 
Each Guldbagge Awards ceremony is listed chronologically below along with the winner of the Guldbagge Award for Best Cinematography and the film associated with the award. Before 1991 the awards did not announce nominees, only winners. In the columns under the winner of each award are the other nominees for best cinematography, which are listed from 1991 and forward.

See also 
 Academy Award for Best Cinematography
 BAFTA Award for Best Cinematography

Notes and references

External links 
  
  
 

Cinematography
Awards for best cinematography
 
Cinematography